India competed in the 2019 South Asian Games in Kathmandu and Pokhara, Nepal from 1 to 10 December 2019.A total of 487 competitors participated in the games. Tejinder Pal Singh Toor was the flag bearer at the opening ceremony. India finished top of the medal tally with 175 gold, 92 silver and 45 bronze.

Medalists

Medals by sports

Badminton

Men

Team

Women

Team

Taekwondo

Poomsae

Triathlon

See also 

 Doping at the South Asian Games
India at the South Asian Games

References 

Nations at the 2019 South Asian Games
2019
2019 in Indian sport